Thornton Kenneth Petersen (born March 26, 1939) is a former American football player who played with the Minnesota Vikings. He played college football at the University of Utah.

References

1939 births
Living people
American football guards
Utah Utes football players
Minnesota Vikings players
Players of American football from Utah
Sportspeople from Logan, Utah